Lead is a city in Lawrence County, South Dakota, United States. The population was 2,982 at the 2020 census. Lead is located in western South Dakota, in the Black Hills near the Wyoming state line.

History
The city was officially founded on July 10, 1876, after the discovery of gold. The city was named for the leads or lodes of the deposits of valuable ores. It is the site of the Homestake Mine, the largest, deepest and most productive gold mine in the Western Hemisphere before closing in January 2002.  By 1910, Lead had a population of 8,382, making it the second largest town in South Dakota.

Lead was founded as a company town by the Homestake Mining Company, which ran the nearby Homestake Mine. Phoebe Hearst, wife of George Hearst, one of the principals, was instrumental in making Lead more livable. She established the Hearst Free Public Library in town, and in 1900 the Hearst Free Kindergarten. Phoebe Hearst and Thomas Grier, the Homestake Mine superintendent, worked together to create the Homestake Opera House and Recreation Center for the benefit of miner workers and their families. Phoebe Hearst donated regularly to Lead's churches, and provided college scholarships from Lead–Deadwood school which holds a staff of over 130 to the children of mine and mill workers.

In the early 1930s, due to fear of cave-ins of the miles of tunnels under Lead's Homestake Mine, many of the town's buildings located in the bottom of a canyon were moved further uphill to safer locations.

Lead and the Homestake Mine have been selected as the site of the Deep Underground Science and Engineering Laboratory, a proposed NSF facility for low-background experiments on neutrinos, dark matter, and other nuclear physics topics, as well as biology and mine engineering studies.

In 1974, most of Lead was added to the National Register of Historic Places under the name of the "Lead Historic District".

Geography
Lead is located at  (44.350967, -103.765784).

Lead has been assigned the ZIP code 57754 and the FIPS place code 36220.

Two prominent manmade features of Lead's geography are the giant open cut, which was used for surface gold mining by the Homestake Mine, and the resulting ridge nearby built with the non-producing material from the cut.

Climate
Lead has a humid continental climate (Köppen Dfb) with warm summers and cold, very snowy winters with the typical extremely variable temperatures of the western Great Plains.

During the cold and snowy winter of 1993–94, a whopping  of snow fell and three years later snowfall totalled . The coldest temperature has been  on February 8, 1936.

During the spring, weather becomes very changeable with frequent severe storms: the first maximum of at least  can be expected on April 17, but the last spring freeze normally does not occur until May 24. The spring is also the wettest season owing to the frequent storms, with the wettest month of May 1965 seeing  of precipitation. The hottest temperature has been  on July 7, 1936 during a notorious Plains heat wave. Precipitation is lower in summer than in spring, and declines further into the fall and winter as temperatures cool. Fall weather is similarly variable in temperature, as is the spring; however, the fall period tends to be less prone to severe weather.

Demographics

2010 census
At the 2010 census there were 3,124 people in 1,420 households, including 828 families, in the city. The racial makeup of the city was 94.6% White, 0.3% African American, 2.0% Native American, 0.4% Asian, 0.4% from other races, and 2.3% from two or more races. Hispanic or Latino people of any race were 2.9%.

Of the 1,420 households 27.6% had children under the age of 18 living with them, 40.6% were married couples living together, 13.0% had a female householder with no husband present, 4.7% had a male householder with no wife present, and 41.7% were non-families. 35.1% of households were one person and 10.8% were one person aged 65 or older. The average household size was 2.19 and the average family size was 2.82.

The median age was 40.5 years. 23.1% of residents were under the age of 18; 7.4% were between the ages of 18 and 24; 25.3% were from 25 to 44; 31.5% were from 45 to 64; and 12.7% were 65 or older. The gender makeup of the city was 50.3% male and 49.7% female.

2000 census
At the 2000 census there were 3,027 people in 1,279 households, including 832 families, in the city. The population density was 1,521.5 people per square mile (587.3/km). There were 1,617 housing units at an average density of 812.8 per square mile (313.7/km).  The racial makeup of the city was 95.74% White, 0.23% African American, 2.25% Native American, 0.20% Asian, 0.59% from other races, and 0.99% from two or more races. Hispanic or Latino people of any race were 2.71%. 36.5% were of German, 8.1% English, 7.8% Irish, 7.1% Norwegian and 6.7% American ancestry according to Census 2000.

Of the 1,279 households 33.2% had children under the age of 18 living with them, 47.8% were married couples living together, 12.4% had a female householder with no husband present, and 34.9% were non-families. 29.2% of households were one person and 11.8% were one person aged 65 or older. The average household size was 2.35 and the average family size was 2.89.

The age distribution was 26.1% under the age of 18, 8.5% from 18 to 24, 30.2% from 25 to 44, 22.2% from 45 to 64, and 13.0% 65 or older. The median age was 37 years. For every 100 females, there were 100.9 males. For every 100 females age 18 and over, there were 96.8 males.

As of 2000 the median income for a household in the city was $29,485, and the median family income was $35,855. Males had a median income of $25,958 versus $18,841 for females. The per capita income for the city was $15,726. About 10.7% of families and 12.9% of the population were below the poverty line, including 15.7% of those under age 18 and 12.9% of those age 65 or over.

Recreation

In the summer, there are numerous trails for hiking, mountain biking, and horse back riding. The George S. Mickelson Trail, which runs from Edgemont to Deadwood, runs through the city. Several man made lakes, including Sheridan Lake provide fishing and swimming. Spearfish Canyon to the north has many places to rock climb.

During the winter there are two ski areas just a few miles outside of Lead. Terry Peak and Deer Mountain are both full service ski areas.

Local media

AM radio
 KBHB 810
 KKLS 920
 KDSJ 980
 KTOQ 1340
 KBFS 1450

FM radio
 KRCS 93.1
 KKMK 93.9
 KSQY 95.1
 KZZI 95.9
 KOUT 98.7
 KFXS 100.3
 KDDX 101.1
 KFMH 101.9
 KYDT 103.1
 KIQK 104.1

Television
 KHSD Ch. 11 ABC
 KCLO Ch. 16 CBS
 KNBN Ch. 21 NBC
 KBHE-TV Ch. 26 PBS

Notable people

 Richard Bullock (1847–1921), American pioneer
 Sean Covel (b. 1976), film producer
 James B. Dunn (1927–2016), South Dakota legislator
 Thomas D. Edwards, Consul General of the United States to Ciudad Juarez
 Stan Gibilisco, writer
 John Miljan (1892–1960), actor
 Charles Moyer (1866–1929), labor leader and former president of the Western Federation of Miners
 William H. Parker (1905–1966), former chief of the Los Angeles Police Department
 Len Rice (1918–1992), baseball player
 Mina P. Shaughnessy (1924–1978), professor at the City University of New York and pioneering scholar of basic writing
 Mike Steponovich (1908–1974), football player with the Boston Redskins
 Charles Windolph (1851–1950), recipient of the Medal of Honor and the last surviving white participant in the Battle of Little Bighorn

References

External links

 
 Lead Tourism

Black Hills
Cities in South Dakota
Historic districts on the National Register of Historic Places in South Dakota
Cities in Lawrence County, South Dakota
Populated places established in 1876
1876 establishments in Dakota Territory
Mining communities in South Dakota
National Register of Historic Places in Lawrence County, South Dakota
Populated places on the National Register of Historic Places